Razmak (Pashto and ) is one of the three subdivisions of North Waziristan District in Pakistan, the other two being Mir Ali and Miran Shah. The inhabitants are almost exclusively Wazir Pashtuns, along with a few from the Mahsud tribe. The town of Razmak is located just north of Makeen, South Waziristan.

The Razmak subdivision of North Waziristan is divided into three Tehsils: Razmak, Dossali, and Garyum. Dossali is a low-lying area with a warm and dry climate. Garyum is a hilly and cold area. Razmak Tehsil is the coldest and wettest of the three Tehsils because of its higher elevation.  It is pleasant in summers, but snow clad in the winters.

Razmak town is the main settlement of the Razmak subdivision. The height above sea level of Razmak town is 2010 m. Razmak is known as "Mini London" due to its beauty. The Ramzak valley is one of the major tourist destinations. The famous Pashtun tribal leader Mirzali Khan (Faqir of Ipi) was based in Gurwek, but also hided for a long time in Razmak. Gurwek is a remote village in Waziristan on the border with Afghanistan.

History

Stories about Haji Mirzali Khan (Faqir of Ipi) are part of the folklore of the area. He was a tribal leader of Waziristan who rebelled against the British Raj, and started a guerilla warfare against the British. His movement was based in Gurwek, a remote village in Waziristan on the border with Afghanistan. It is said that the troops were after him and when they fired at him, their bullets melted midway and fell on ground. This is said to be the origin of the many grey hard pebbles lying on the hills of Razmak where Mirzali Khan was hiding.

After the creation of Pakistan in August 1947, Mirzali Khan and his followers refused to recognise Pakistan, and launched a campaign against Pakistan. He continued their guerilla warfare against the new nation's government. In 1950, he announced the creation of Pashtunistan as an independent nation. A Pashtun tribal jirga, held in Razmak, appointed Mirzali Khan as the President of the National Assembly for Pashtunistan.

However, later on Faqir Ipi, while addressing a gathering at Razmak, said that the Government of Afghanistan had misled him and deceived him in the name of Islam. He instructed his supporters that if the Government of Afghanistan made any future plan against Pakistan in his name, they should never support it.

People
The population is migratory and owns land also in other parts of the North Waziristan Agency where they migrate when it gets too cold. The main tribes that inhabit Razmak subdivision are Toori Khel, Boora Khel and Dirdooni.
The dynamics of the society are governed by oligarchy. The elders of the tribes and families are the unelected leaders. The main elders of the area are Noor Baqi Jan, Zuman Alikhel, Nawaz Shakhimar in Toori khel, Shahzada and Saudal in boorakel, Hakeem Jan in Dirdooni.

Torikhel
The Torikhel clan lives in the mountains of Razmak.  Used to climbing hills on foot, they are tough and hardy fighters. The Torikhel are further divided into Khushali, Alikhel, and Shogi  subtribes. The Khushali is the bigger tribe among the Torikhel subtribes. The Khushali are further divided into nine subtribes. As per Nikat, the traditional tribal distribution, every thing in Razmak Tehsil is distributed equally among these tribes. Cadet College Razmak is also located here.

Boorakhel

Boorakhel are involved in trade and business, many of them drive trucks and buses down in the rest of Pakistan. They have apple orchards on the hills of Razmak. Their hospitality is very well known in Wazir Tribe.

Dossali 
Well Educated people .

Mandey Khel (MDK)'

Mandey Khell is a part of Tehsil Dossali , Their hospitality is very well known in Wazir Tribe. They are peaceful people who usually cooperate with the government and follow strict tribal discipline.

Dirdooni

Dattakhel tehsil is occupied by the Dirdooni subtribe. They are peaceful people who usually cooperate with the government and follow strict tribal discipline.

Mahsud
The Mahsud live in the southern part of Razmak near Shuidar Ghar, as well as in the adjoining South Waziristan.

Garyum tehsil 
Garyum is probably the most underdeveloped of the three tehsils with a few roads and schools. It is inhabited mainly by Madikhel and Shogi subtribes.

Transportation
Means of transportation in the area are travelling on foot or 4x4 vehicles.

Religion
The religion of the people is Islam.  They adhere very strictly to their traditions and see any change as an intrusion and inherently bad. Their code of conduct "pushtoonwali" is their religion. Anything against pushtoonwali is declared and accepted as unislamic.

Education

There are many schools in the area but literacy rate in the area is low. Schools are usually owned and managed by the local elders and have been granted to them and are being funded by the government as a bribe. The interest of education in the general population is evident and most of the youth understands the importance of education.

See also
Mirzali Khan
Mir Kalam Wazir

References

External links

Populated places in North Waziristan
Wars involving the Taliban
Waziristan